There are two grading systems used in Italy:

To someone familiar with both the Italian and the U.S. college systems, Italian grades are best translated into American grades (and vice versa) according to the following table:

Scuola primaria, scuola secondaria di primo e secondo grado

In Italian primary and secondary school a 10-point scale is used, 6 being the minimum grade for passing.
 
Traditionally in the most prestigious high schools (Liceo Classico, Liceo Scientifico, Liceo Linguistico and Liceo delle Scienze Umane), grades vary within a limited range, between 2 and 8, often with each professor applying his/her own custom. When a professor wants to apply a more precise scale, instead of using the full 1–10 scale (which would have made their scale not comparable with that of other professors) they would often insert a plethora of symbols and decimals: the range between 5 and 6 would then be covered, in sequence, by 5+, 5½ and 6−. Sufficiency starts at 6. The "+" symbol stands for "+0.25" (5+=5.25) and the "-" symbol stands for "-0.25" (6-=5.75). Some professors, however, also use symbols such as 5++, 5/6 and 6--, which have no precise value. There has been a push in recent years to uniform the system to the 0–10 scale. A grade below 6 is considered insufficient, while a grade below 4 is considered to be extremely insufficient.

In high school, if a student, at the end of the year, reports an insufficient grade average in a certain subject (5 or below), he or she has to take a reparatory exam in September, before school begins; if the result of the reparatory exam is again not sufficient, the student cannot pass to the next year and will have to repeat it. A student who, at the end of the year, has more than 3 insufficient subjected will not pass to following class and will have to repeat the year. This is anyway subject to the judgment of professors, who can evaluate what to do according to the case.

University
For ordinary exams, universities in Italy use a 30-point scale that can be divided into failing (0 to 17) and passing (18 to 30 cum laude) grades. For final assessment of the entire degree, a 110-point scale is used, which is divided into two as well, with 66 being the minimum for a degree to be awarded. The 110-point scale incorporates scores both on course exams and for the final thesis. For outstanding results, lode, "praise" or "cum laude," is added to the maximum grade.

The table is purely indicative: there are significant differences between different universities and above all between bachelor's and master's degrees. The grades received by master's degree students are statistically higher than those received by bachelor's degrees.

Italian grade conversion tables for Erasmus

Belgium

Denmark

Finland

France

Germany

Hungary

Ireland

Romania

The Netherlands

Portugal

Spain

United Kingdom

References 
 

Italy
Education in Italy
Grading